Mimudea distictalis is a moth in the family Crambidae. It was described by George Hampson in 1918. It is found in Colombia.

Taxonomy
The species name is preoccupied by Mimudea distictalis, also described by Hampson, but in 1913.

References

Moths described in 1913
Spilomelinae